Memories is a compilation album by American singer Barbra Streisand, released in 1981. It is primarily a compilation of previously released material, but includes three newly recorded songs. The album was certified 5× Platinum by the RIAA, reaching number 10 on the US Billboard 200. First released on Columbia, it was re-released under the CBS imprint in 1981 with four additional tracks. In the UK, where it was released as Love Songs, it reached number 1 on the UK Albums Chart for nine weeks (seven of them consecutively and it became the best-selling album of 1982 there, the first album by a female performer to achieve it). The album was certified platinum in the UK (prior to multi-platinum awards being given), and 6× platinum in Australia. According to the liner notes of Streisand's retrospective box set, Just for the Record, the album also received a record certification in the Netherlands and in Switzerland.

Two brand new recordings "Memory" and "Comin' In and Out of Your Life" were included and both released as singles. "Comin' In and Out of Your Life" was the most successful of the new singles, peaking at No. 11 on the Billboard Hot 100 in the US. The album also included a previously unreleased solo version of "Lost Inside of You" which had appeared on her 1976 soundtrack album A Star Is Born as a duet with Kris Kristofferson.

The album won Brit Award for British Album of the Year as Best Selling Album at the 1983 Brit Awards. It sold over 10 million copies worldwide.

Track listing

Personnel
 Charles Calello – producer
 Nancy Donald – design
 Albhy Galuten – producer
 Bob Gaudio – producer
 Barry Gibb – producer
 Greg Gorman – photography
 Gary Klein – producer
 Charles Koppelman – executive producer
 Tony Lane – design
 Andrew Lloyd Webber – producer
 Marty Paich – arranger, producer
 Phil Ramone – producer
 Karl Richardson – producer
 Barbra Streisand – producer

Charts

Weekly charts

Year-end charts

Certifications and sales

See also
 List of best-selling albums by women

References

External links
 Barbra Archives - Memories album page.

1981 compilation albums
Barbra Streisand compilation albums
Columbia Records compilation albums
Brit Award for British Album of the Year
Albums arranged by Marty Paich
Albums produced by Phil Ramone